The Pons Fabricius ("Fabrician Bridge") or Ponte dei Quattro Capi, is the oldest Roman bridge in Rome, Italy, still existing in its original state. Built in 62 BC, it spans half of the Tiber River, from the Campus Martius on the east side to Tiber Island in the middle (the Pons Cestius is west of the island). Quattro Capi ("four heads") refers to the two marble pillars of the two-faced Janus herms on the parapet, which were moved here from the nearby Church of St Gregory (Monte Savello) in the 14th century.

Bridge

According to Dio Cassius, the bridge was built in 62 BC, the year after Cicero was consul, to replace an earlier wooden bridge destroyed by fire. It was commissioned by Lucius Fabricius, the curator of the roads and a member of the gens Fabricia of Rome. Completely intact from Roman antiquity, it has been in continuous use ever since.

The Pons Fabricius has a length of 62 m, and is 5.5 m wide. It is constructed from two wide arches spanning 80 feet, supported by a central pillar in the middle of the stream. The arches of this bridge are the first ones on any Roman bridge that were not semi-circular. This is possibly caused by the semi-circle being located below the water line. Its core is constructed of tuff. Its outer facing today is made of bricks and travertine. A relief is located 20 feet above the pier. During times of flood, this relief served as an additional waterway.

Inscription 

An original inscription on the travertine commemorates its builder in Latin: L . FABRICIVS . C . F . CVR . VIAR | FACIVNDVM . COERAVIT | IDEMQVE | PROBAVIT ("Lucius Fabricius, son of Gaius, superintendent of the roads, took care and likewise approved that it be built"). It is repeated four times, once on each side of each arch.

A later inscription, in smaller lettering, records that the bridge was restored under Pope Innocent XI, probably in 1679.

See also
 
 List of Roman bridges
 List of ancient monuments in Rome
 Roman architecture
 Roman engineering

References

Sources

External links 
 LacusCurtius: Pons Fabricius
 
 The Waters of Rome: Tiber River Bridges and the Development of the Ancient City of Rome
 Tiber Island information 
Ponte Fabricio  

Bridges in Rome
Roman bridges in Italy
Deck arch bridges
Stone bridges in Italy
Bridges completed in the 1st century BC
Rome R. XII Ripa